This is a list of railway museums in Switzerland.

List
 Albula Railway Museum
 Bahn der internationalen Rheinregulierung (IRR)
 Blonay–Chamby Museum Railway (BC)
 Dampfbahn-Verein Zürcher Oberland (DVZO)
 Furka Steam Railway (Dampfbahn Furka-Bergstrecke or DFB)
 Schinznacher Baumschulbahn (SchBB) (www.schbb.ch)(English)
 Swiss Transport Museum, Lucerne
 Zürcher Museums-Bahn, Zurich

See also
 List of heritage railways and funiculars in Switzerland
 List of museums in Switzerland

External links
 Union of Historic Railways in Switzerland

Museums
Railway
 
Switzerland